Argilly is a commune in the Côte-d'Or department in the Bourgogne-Franche-Comté region of eastern France.

The inhabitants of the commune are known as Argilliens or Argilliennes

Geography
Argilly is located some 8 km south-east of Nuits-Saint-Georges and 12 km north-east of Beaune. Access to the commune is by the D35 road from Gerland to the north passing through the commune north of the village and continuing to Bagnot in the east. Access to the village is by the D20 which branches off the D35 in the commune and passes south-west through the village and continues to Beaune. The A36 autoroute passes through the south of the commune but there is no exit in or near the commune. The commune is heavily forested in the north-east, east, and south with more forest in the north-west. The rest of the commune is farmland.

There is the Étang de Longbroche reservoir south-east of the village with streams flowing into it and the Meuzin stream flows south west of the village.

Neighbouring communes and villages

History
The Castle of the Dukes of Burgundy was destroyed in 1590. There was also a tile factory which belonged to the Dukes.

Heraldry

Administration

List of Successive Mayors

Demography
In 2017 the commune had 513 inhabitants.

Sites and Monuments

A Merovingian villa and a large necropolis detected by aerial photography (objects at the Rodier Museum at Nuits-Saint-Georges).
A Motte and Bailey castle of the Dukes.
A fortified farmhouse from the 16th century with remains of the old castle: turret, hexagonal spiral staircase, bay windows with curly brackets, huge fireplaces, French ceilings.
A Feudal mound and turrets from the fortified Chateau of Antilly.
A Lavoir (Public Laundry) (1875) is registered as an historical monument.
The Parish Church of the Assumption (13th century) is registered as an historical monument. It was rebuilt in the 18th century: the choir and transept are from the 13th century; the belfry the nave, and the monumental façade are from the 18th century. The church contains the following items registered as historical objects:
A Pulpit (18th century)
Bust/Reliquary of Saint-Reine (18th century)
Bust/Reliquary of Saint-Robert (18th century)
2 candlesticks (18th century) from Citeaux Abbey
Set of 8 candlesticks and an altar cross (17th century)
A Statue: Virgin and Child (17th century)
A Statue: Saint Peter (15th century) by Claus Sluter.
A Tomb (13th century)

Notable people linked to the commune
Jean II Quarré, in 1416 received the fief of La Mothe d'Argilly from John the Fearless, Duke of Burgundy, who allowed him to take all the wood necessary for the construction of his house in La Mothe.
Pierre Ranvial was Chatelain of the Chateau of Argilly in the year 1454. In the same year he was knighted.

See also
Communes of the Côte-d'Or department

References

External links
Argilly on the National Geographic Institute website 
Argilly on Géoportail, National Geographic Institute (IGN) website 
Argilly on the 1750 Cassini Map

Communes of Côte-d'Or